The Old Polk County Courthouse (also known as the Imperial Polk County Courthouse) (constructed in 1908–09) is an historic courthouse in Bartow, Florida, located at 100 East Main Street. It was ostensibly designed in the Classical Revival style by architect Edward Columbus Hosford. On August 7, 1989, it was added to the U.S. National Register of Historic Places.

The Polk County Historical Museum is located in the courthouse.

References

 Polk County listings at National Register of Historic Places
 Florida's Office of Cultural and Historical Programs
 Polk County listings
 Polk County markers
 Polk County Historical Museum
 Polk County Courthouse at Florida's Historic Courthouses
 Florida's Historic Courthouses by Hampton Dunn

County courthouses in Florida
National Register of Historic Places in Polk County, Florida
Edward Columbus Hosford buildings
Neoclassical architecture in Florida
Buildings and structures in Bartow, Florida
Clock towers in Florida
1909 establishments in Florida
Government buildings completed in 1909